The Moukahla or moukalla was a type of musket widely used in North Africa, produced by many tribes, clans and nations.

Mechanism

Lock 
Two systems of gunlock prevailed in the Moukahla, one, which derived from Dutch and English types of snaphance lock, usually with a thicker lockplate. Half cock was provided by a dog catch behind the cock. At full cock, the sear passing through the lockplate engaged the heel of the cock.  The other mechanism was the so-called Arab toe-lock, a form of miquelet lock, closely allied to the agujeta lock (which required a back or dog catch for half cock) and the Italian romanlock. The term miquelet is used today to describe a particular type of snaplock. The miquelet lock, in all varieties, was common for several centuries in the countries surrounding the Mediterranean, particularly in Spain, Italy, the Balkans, and Ottoman domains including the coastal states of North Africa. The type of musket would be described as a Kabyle snaphance or a Kabyle miquelet. Some muskets were converted to the percussion lock starting in the mid-19th century.

Other parts 
The caliber of musket ball fired was large, usually in the .67 range. These guns were very long, around 6 feet. The plain barrel alone is 44 to 52 inches in length. The barrel was retained in the stock by about twelve iron, brass, or silver bands (capucines). When silver was used, it was often done in the niello form. These muskets may have all metal work engraved and locks may be covered in sheet silver. The stock and trumpet-shaped butt is typically enhanced by engraved silver shapes inlaid with coral or ivory. Even the exposed parts of the wooden ramrod is encased with silver.

Issues 
Issues in the weapon were noted. Although when it was first made, its range was impressive thanks to its long barrel, by the 19th century its range became completely average, and by the 20th century it was completely outdated and short-ranged. It caused a lot of smoke when fired which only cleared after a long time. The majority of these guns did not have bayonets, although organized units such as the Odjak of Algiers, the Odjak of Tunis, and to a certain extent the Black Guard of Morocco did have bayonets equipped.

Origin and usage 
These muskets were produced across the Maghreb region, in modern Morocco, Algeria, and Tunisia, where they were the most widespread type of guns. They were so widespread in fact, that every musket was called a moukahla, and european handbooks called translated the english word "gun" as moukahla. They were locally produced.

Significance 
The Moukahla played a major role in Maghrebi wars up until the early 20th century. It was the most used, and produced musket in the armies of the Kingdom of Morocco, and the Deylik of Algiers.

References 

Blair, Claude and Leonid Tarassuk, Editors. The Complete Encyclopedia of Arms and Weapons. New York: 1982 
Elgood, Robert. Firearms of the Islamic World in the Tareg Rajab Museum, Kuwait. London: 1995

See also
 Jezail a similar Afghan weapon

Muskets
African weapons
Weapons of the Ottoman Empire